Bliss, originally titled Bucolic Green Hills, is the default computer wallpaper of Microsoft's Windows XP operating system. It is a virtually unedited photograph of a green hill and blue sky with white clouds in the Los Carneros American Viticultural Area of California's Wine Country. Charles O'Rear took the photo in January 1996 and Microsoft bought the rights in 2000. It is estimated that billions of people have seen the picture, possibly making it the most viewed photograph in history.

Overview 
Former National Geographic photographer Charles O'Rear, a resident of the nearby Napa Valley, took the photo on film with a medium-format Mamiya RZ67 camera while on his way to visit his girlfriend in 1996. While it was widely believed later that the image was manipulated or even created with software such as Adobe Photoshop, O'Rear says it never was. He sold it to Westlight for use as a stock photo titled Bucolic Green Hills. Westlight was bought by Corbis in 1998, who digitized its best selling images. Two years following the acquisition, Microsoft's design team selected images to be used as wallpapers in Windows XP. The image would eventually be chosen as the default wallpaper, resulting in the company acquiring the image and renaming it to Bliss.

The image also became part of Microsoft's $200 million "Yes You Can" advertising campaign to promote their software, and has been the subject of many parodies.

Microsoft chose the image because "it illustrates the experiences Microsoft strives to provide customers (freedom, possibility, calmness, warmth, etc.)."
Due to the market success of Windows XP, over the next decade it was claimed to be the most viewed photograph in the world during that time.

History 

In January 1996, former National Geographic photographer O'Rear was on his way from his home in St. Helena, California, in the Napa Valley north of San Francisco, to visit his girlfriend, Daphne Irwin (whom he later married), in the city, as he did every Friday afternoon. He was working with Irwin on a book about the wine country. He was particularly alert for a photo opportunity that day, since a storm had just passed over and other recent winter rains had left the area especially green. 

Driving along the Sonoma Highway (California State Route 12 and 121) he saw the hill, free of the vineyards that normally covered the area; they had been pulled out a few years earlier following a phylloxera infestation. "There it was! My God, the grass is perfect! It's green! The sun is out; there's some clouds," he remembered thinking. He stopped near the Napa–Sonoma county line (approximately at ) and pulled off the road. 

To take the photo, O'Rear used a Mamiya RZ67 medium-format camera on a tripod, choosing Fujifilm's Velvia, a film often used among nature photographers and known to saturate some colors. O'Rear credits that combination of camera and film for the success of the image. "It made the difference and, I think, helped the Bliss photograph stand out even more," he said. "I think that if I had shot it with 35 mm, it would not have nearly the same effect." While he was setting up his camera, he said it was possible that the clouds in the picture came in. "Everything was changing so quickly at that time." 

He took four shots and got back into his truck. According to O'Rear, the image was not digitally enhanced or manipulated in any way.

Since it was not pertinent to the wine-country book, O'Rear made it available through Westlight (transferred to Corbis after its acquisition) as a stock photo, available for use by any interested party willing to pay an appropriate licensing fee. He also submitted a vertical shot, which was available at the same time. 

In 2000, Microsoft's Windows XP development team contacted O'Rear through Corbis, which he believes they used instead of larger competitor Getty Images, also based in Seattle, because the former company is owned by Microsoft founder Bill Gates. "I have no idea what [they] were looking for," he recalls. "Were they looking for an image that was peaceful? Were they looking for an image that had no tension?" Another image of O'Rear's titled Full Moon over Red Dunes, known as Red moon desert in Windows XP, was also considered as the default wallpaper, but was changed due to testers comparing it to buttocks.

Microsoft said they wanted not just to license the image for use as XP's default wallpaper, but to buy all the rights to it. They offered O'Rear what he says is the second-largest payment ever made to a photographer for a single image; however, he signed a confidentiality agreement and cannot disclose the exact amount. It has been reported to be "in the low six figures." O'Rear needed to send Microsoft the original film and sign the paperwork; however, when couriers and delivery services became aware of the value of the shipment, they declined since it was higher than their insurance would cover. Instead, the software company bought O'Rear a plane ticket and he personally delivered it to their offices. "I had no idea where it was going to go," he said. "I don't think the engineers or anybody at Microsoft had any idea it would have the success it's had."

Microsoft gave the photo its current name, and made it a key part of its marketing campaign for XP. Although it is often said that it was cropped slightly to the left and the greens were made slightly stronger, the version Microsoft bought from Corbis had been cropped like this to begin with, while the saturation is a result of the Velvia film. The photographer estimates that the image has been seen on a billion computers worldwide, based on the number of copies of XP sold since then.

Attempts to recreate 

In November 2006, Goldin+Senneby visited the site in Sonoma Valley where the Bliss image was taken, re-photographing the same view now full of grapevines (pictured). Their work After Microsoft was first shown in the exhibition "Paris was Yesterday" at the gallery La Vitrine in April 2007. It was later exhibited at 300m³ in Gothenburg.

Reception 
O'Rear concedes that despite all the other photographs he took for National Geographic, he will probably be remembered most for Bliss. "Anybody now from age 15 on for the rest of their life will remember this photograph," he said in 2014.

Since the origins of the image were not widely known for several years after XP's release, there had been considerable speculation about where the landscape was. Some guesses have included locations in France, England, Switzerland, the North Otago region of New Zealand, southeastern Washington and the south of Tübingen, Germany.
Dutch users believed the photograph was shot in Ireland's County Kerry since the image was named "Ireland" in the Dutch release of the software; similarly, the image was named "Alentejo" in the Portuguese version, leading users speaking that language to believe it had been taken in the eponymous region of Portugal.

Other users have speculated that the image was not of a real location, that the sky came from a separate image and was spliced together with the hill. O'Rear is adamant that, other than Corbis' minor alterations to the digitized version, he did nothing to it in a darkroom, contrasting it with Adams' Monolith:

In December 2001, Microsoft released a screensaver under the name of Bliss, with the scenery similar to the image, but with animating effects.

In 2012, David Clark of the British magazine Amateur Photographer commented on Bliss's aesthetic qualities. "Critics might argue that the image is bland and lacks a point of interest, while supporters would say that its evocation of a bright, clear day in a beautiful landscape is itself the subject", he wrote. He notes the "dreamlike quality" created by the filtered sunlight on the hillside as distinguishing the image. "What made Microsoft choose the image above all others?" he asked. Although the company had never told O'Rear or anyone else, Clark thought he could guess. "It's attractive, easy on the eye and doesn't detract from other items that might be on the screen are all contributing factors. It may also have been chosen because it's an unusually inviting image of a verdant landscape and one that promotes a sense of wellbeing in desk-bound computer users."

On July 8, 2021, the Microsoft 365 team published a series of nostalgic themed Microsoft Teams backgrounds, that included a wallpaper based on the scenery of Bliss.

See also 
 California State Route 12
 List of photographs considered the most important

References

External links 

 Google Street View of the hill

1996 works
1996 in art
1996 in California
Sonoma County, California
Color photographs
Photographs of the United States
Landscape photographs
Windows XP
1990s photographs
Stock photography